Seleznyovo is a settlement on Karelian Isthmus, near Vyborg, in Vyborgsky District of Leningrad Oblast, served by the Prigorodnaya (Tienhaara) station of the Riihimäki-Saint Petersburg railroad.

Rural localities in Leningrad Oblast
Karelian Isthmus